Let It Roll may refer to:

Albums
Let It Roll (Little Feat album), or the title song, 1988
Let It Roll (Don Johnson album), or the title song, 1989
Let It Roll (Willard Grant Conspiracy album), or the title song, 2006
Let It Roll (Midland album), or the title song, 2019
Let It Roll: Songs by George Harrison, 2009

Songs
"Let It Roll" (Doug Lazy song), 1989
"Let It Roll" (Flo Rida song), 2012
"Let It Roll" (Emerson Drive song), 2012
"Let It Roll", a 1994 song by Nitty Gritty Dirt Band from Acoustic
"Let It Roll", a 2001 song by Train from Drops of Jupiter
"Let It Roll", a 2003 song by Hieroglyphics from Full Circle
"Let It Roll", a 2006 song by the Devin Townsend Band from Synchestra
"Let It Roll", a 2007 song by Velvet Revolver from Libertad
"Let It Roll", a 2007 song by All Time Low from So Wrong, It's Right
"Let It Roll", a 2010 song by Superchick from Reinvention
"Let It Roll", a 2019 song by Lewis Capaldi from the extended edition of Divinely Uninspired to a Hellish Extent